The Anson M. Allebach (registered as Allbach) House is a house located in Houston, Texas listed on the National Register of Historic Places.

History 
The house at 2023 Arlington is contained within the boundaries of the Houston Heights, which was designated a Multiple Resource Area (MRA) by the National Register Program on June 22, 1983. Although the spelling of the name in the National Register nomination is Allbach, the actual correct spelling of the name is Allebach. The Allebach House was built circa 1912 and is classified as a Bungalow style house.

See also
 National Register of Historic Places listings in Harris County, Texas

References

Houses completed in 1912
Colonial Revival architecture in Texas
Bungalow architecture in Texas
National Register of Historic Places in Houston
Houses on the National Register of Historic Places in Texas
1912 establishments in Texas
Houses in Houston